Chaudhary Bansi Lal Cricket Stadium is a cricket ground near State Highway 16 in Lahli, Haryana. The stadium can accommodate only 8,000 spectators and came to prominence when Sachin Tendulkar played his last Ranji Trophy match here in October 2013.

The pitch remains lively as the water-level is unusually high in Lahli. At places, water is found only two to four foot below the ground, and that helps in keeping the pitch and outfield green.

The venue made its first-class debut with a Haryana-Andhra game in November 2006. The highest team total here has been 529-6 declared by Orissa against Haryana in the 2015/16 season. The highest individual score at this ground was scored by Natraj Behera (255*) for Orissa against Haryana in 2015/16.

References

External links
 Cricinfo profile
 CricketArchive profile

Cricket grounds in Haryana
Rohtak
Sports venues completed in 2006
2006 establishments in Haryana